The NSW Philip Parsons Fellowship for Emerging Playwrights, formerly the Philip Parsons Young Playwrights Award, is an Australian annual award for early-career playwrights in New South Wales, offered by Belvoir St Theatre and Arts NSW from 1995. It was last awarded in 2018.

History
The award was established in 1995, named in honour of Philip Parsons  (1926–1993), who was a co-founder of the performing arts publishing company Currency Press, and "an influential teacher and mentor to many of the students, scholars, actors, directors and playwrights who created the new wave of Australian theatre in the 1970s".

Hilary Bell won the inaugural award with her play Wolf Lullaby in 1995.

In 2010 Caleb Lewis turned down the award in protest against the lack of gender diversity in the company's 2010 season.

From 2013 the award was renamed the Philip Parsons Fellowship for Emerging Playwrights.

In 2019 (for 2020), the Fellowship evolved into the NSW Philip Parsons Early-Career Playwrights' Lab, whereby Belvoir would take on four new writers (or teams) along with one story developer or dramaturgical/ directorial participant. Successful applicants would work with Belvoir for a year (2020) on developing a new work. However, this did not appear to extend beyond 2020.

Description
Recipients of the original award had to be under the age of 35 years and a resident of New South Wales; but the fellowship, by 2016, was open to a playwright of any age, within the first eight years of their professional practice. This requirement continued when the fellowship became the playwrights' lab in the 2020 edition, which dropped the requirement to be a NSW resident.

The fellowship is presented as part of the Philip Parsons Memorial Lecture, given annually at the Belvoir St Theatre. The winner is selected on the basis of a completed and produced script and an outline for another work. The winner received a full commission from Belvoir to develop their outline into a full play.

Winners of the award
NSW Philip Parsons Fellowship for Emerging Playwrights
 2018 – Kendall Feaver – Almighty Sometimes
 2017 – Emme Hoy – Exctinction
 2016 – Holly Austin, Adriano Cappelletta and Jo Turner – Ruby's Wish
 2015 – Nakkiah Lui – Kill the Messenger and S. Shakthidharan – A Counting and Cracking of Heads (two fellowships were awarded)
 2014 – Julia-Rose Lewis – Samson
 2013 – Ian Meadows – Between Two Waves
Philip Parsons Young Playwrights Award
 2012 – Kit Brookman – Heaven
 2011 – Zoe Coombs Marr – And That Was the Summer That Changed My Life
 2010 – Matthew Whittet -Old Man 
 2009 – Tahli Corin – Blush
 2008 – Khoa Do – To 100 Years of Happiness
 2007 – Tommy Murphy –  Holding the Man
 2006 – Patrick Brammall and John Leary – Vital Organs 
 2005 – Brendan Cowell – Walk Don't Run (2001)
 2004 – Kate Mulvany – The Seed (2008)
 2003 – Jonathan Gavin – A Moment on the Lips
 2002 – (to be identified)
 2001 – (to be identified)
 2000 – Emma Vuletic – Imago
 1999 – Adam Grossetti – Lost Lagoon
 1998 – Niamh Kearney
 1997 – (to be identified)
 1996 – Suneeta Peres Da Costa
 1995 – Hilary Bell – Wolf Lullaby

See also
 List of Australian literary awards

Footnotes

References

Australian literary awards
Dramatist and playwright awards
Literary awards honouring young writers
Awards established in 1996
1996 establishments in Australia